Ionity is a high-power charging station network for electric vehicles to facilitate long-distance travel across Europe. It's a joint venture founded by the BMW Group, Mercedes-Benz Group, Ford Motor Company and Volkswagen Group, but other automotive manufacturers are invited to help expand the network. In November 2020 Hyundai Motor Group entered Ionity as the 5th shareholder.

Charging stations 
 Charging capacity of up to 350 kW per point
  European charging standard Combined Charging System (CCS)
Located on major European highways
 Capable of charging certain cars (e.g. Porsche Taycan Hyundai Ioniq 5, Kia EV6) up to 80 percent in just 18 minutes (in ideal conditions).
Charging stations have from 2 to 16 CCS plugs each, with 4.5 plugs per station on average.
Charging stations have slightly different design, depending on country and manufacturer. 
Most stations (in 2019) were produced by Tritium and ABB, and some by Porsche itself.

Members 
Current members include BMW Group, Daimler AG, Ford Motor Company and Volkswagen Group. In November 2020 Hyundai Motor Group formally joined Ionity after announcing on September 9 2019 that would bring Hyundai and Kia brands on board as strategic partners.

Rollout 
Ionity rollout table: number of open stations per country per quarter.

2017 
The company claimed that a total of 20 stations would open to the public, located on major roads in multiple European countries through partnerships with Tank & Rast, Circle K and OMV. By the end of 2017, no stations were open to the public.

Ionity bid for Europ-e funding from the European Union and was awarded £39.1m to help develop its network, across 13 EU Member States: Austria, Belgium, Denmark, France, Germany, Ireland, Italy, Netherlands, Poland, Portugal, Spain, Sweden, UK.

2018 
First Ionity charging station was opened on 24 April 2018 at Brohltal-Ost on the A61 motorway in Germany's Rhineland-Palatinate.

By August 2018, 7 stations were open: 1 in Germany, 1 in Austria, 2 in France, 2 in Switzerland, and 1 in Denmark, with 4-6 chargers on each. 4 more stations are marked as coming soon.

By October 2018, 10 stations with 4-6 CCS charger plugs were open, 20 stations are marked as "now building". Charging cost for the rest of 2018 was established as 8 (€8, or £8, or 8CHF depending on country) per charging session (no power or time restrictions). In Scandinavia the session fee will be 80 NOK / SEK / DKK. The European Union countries currently remaining without published plans for Ionity chargers include: Bulgaria, Croatia, Republic of Cyprus, Czechia, Estonia, Finland, Greece, Hungary, Ireland, Latvia, Lithuania, Luxembourg, Malta, Poland, Portugal, Romania, Slovakia, Slovenia, Spain, and the UK.

By the end of 2018, 47 stations on map are marked open  and 45 as now building.

2019 
The 100th charging station was open to public in Rygge, Norway on 27 May 2019. On 20 December 2019 200th charging station was completed.

2020 
In 2017, Ionity planned to have "implemented and operate about 400 fast charging stations across European major thoroughfares in 2020".

In January 2020, Ionity announced that customers with no contract would be charged 0.79 euros per kWh. The network was criticized for the 500% rate increase for those drivers without a subscription plan. German automakers shared discounted rates for Connected Mobility Service Providers network participants. For example, Mercedes-Benz announced a reduced Ionity charging price of 0.29 euros per charged kilowatt hour for Mercedes' me Charge users.

2021 
Operating 336 charging stations with just over 1000 stalls at the end of Q1 2021, the network competes with Tesla supercharger's network with 6000 stalls and 600 stations in Europe at the same time. In August 2021, Volkswagen's CEO Herbert Diess, one of the main partners through Porsche, criticizes Ionity Charging Experience on LinkedIn, pointing that the service is simply not good enough with lack of stations, stalls, toilets, and refreshments, and with charging points out of service. "simply not premium".

References

Charging stations
Electric vehicle infrastructure developers